Kyrgyzstan, since independence from the Soviet Union, has struggled to qualify for the AFC Asian Cup. Not considering to be a top team, Kyrgyzstan was regarded as a weaker team, prior to the 2010s.

However, since the 2010s, with the subsequent managerial developments, especially from German and Russian managers, Kyrgyzstan has changed rapidly, and has emerged to become one of the better teams in the continent. Eventually, Kyrgyzstan registered history, by qualifying to their first ever Asian Cup, in 2019. This successful achievement of Kyrgyzstan was deemed to have a positive impact to the nation, which is mostly known for wrestling and traditional archery.

2019 AFC Asian Cup

Group C

Round of sixteen

Asian Cup performance

References

Countries at the AFC Asian Cup